Marco Baliani (born 6 July 1950) is an Italian actor, playwright and theatre director. He is best known for his Teatro di narrazione work Kohlhaas which is based on Heinrich von Kleist's Michael Kohlhaas

Selected filmography

External links 
 
 

1950 births
Living people
Italian male actors
People from Verbania